Crataegus pubescens may refer to:
 Crataegus pubescens C.Presl. a Sicilian hawthorn, sometimes considered to be a synonym of Crataegus orientalis 
 Crataegus pubescens Steud. an illegitimate name for Crataegus mexicana